Ryomyong Condominiums are a six-tower residential development in Pyongyang, North Korea.

History
Construction commenced in April 2016, and the construction of the fifth, 70-story apartment building in Myungmyeong was completed on July 31. On August 24, 2016, the Embassy of Russia released details of the construction internationally, including the completion of the main tower's frame. Exterior finishing work on the towers was completed on April 13, 2017, while interior finishing remained to be done by residents.

Surrounding development
It is part of Ryomyong New Town. The heights of the six towers are as follows:
82 floors 
70 floors 
55 floors 
50 floors 
45 floors 
35 floors

See also

List of tallest buildings in North Korea
Ryomyong New Town

References

Residential buildings in North Korea
Residential buildings completed in 2017
2017 establishments in North Korea